Norin is a surname. Notable people with the surname include:

Carl-Henrik Norin (1920–1967), Swedish jazz saxophonist
Eric Norin (born 1991), Swedish ice hockey player
Gull-Maj Norin (1913–1997), Danish actress

See also
No-Rin, Japanese light novel series

Swedish-language surnames
Danish-language surnames